is a Japanese beauty pageant contestant who won the title of Miss International Japan 2015. She represented Japan in Miss International 2015 in Tokyo, Japan.

References

1995 births
Living people
Japanese beauty pageant winners
Miss International 2015 delegates